Cryptochilus roseus is a species of orchid. It is native to Hong Kong and Hainan in southern China.

References

Orchids of China
Plants described in 1826
Eriinae